Arsikere is a city and taluka in the Hassan district in the state of Karnataka, India. It is the second largest city in Hassan district, demographically. Arsikere city municipal council consists of 31 wards. This region is known for its coconut production and is also called Kalpataru Nadu. Arsikere is the taluk headquarters, a major railway junction in the South Western Railway which links Mangalore and Mysore to North Karnataka and a central place for tourists who visit nearby places that do not have rail access, such as Belur, Halebidu and Shravanabelagola, Harnahalli, and Kodimata.

History
The name Arasikere originates from one of the princesses of the Hoysala Dynasty, who built a lake (kere in Kannada) near the town. Arasi means queen in Kannada. Therefore, it is 'Arasiya+kere' which means "queen's pond". Arasikere was also called Udbhava Sarvajna Vijaya and Ballalapura at various times.

Under the rulers of Vijayanagara, it was under the administrative control of Jagadevaraya of Channaptna and later placed under Thimmappa Nayaka of Tarikere. It was finally under the rule of Shivappa Nayaka of Ikkeri and was acquired from Ikkeri rulers by the Mysore Wodeyars in 1690.

Under the rule of the Wodeyars of Mysore, the area suffered from the raids of the Marathas, and was subsequently turned over to the Marathas by the Wodeyars as security for the payment of tribute.

Geography

Towards northeast of the city, there is a mountainous scrub forest, known as the Nagapuri Forest. Old temples are found in isolation. Bears and Leopards population is the highlight of this forest.

Climate

Education
Notable educational facilities in Arsikere include the following:

School's and Colleges
 Sharadha English school
 St Mary's High school
 Sri Adichunchanagiri English School, Higher primary school, Arsikere
St marys school (Kannada medium)
 Niveditha English Higher primary school
 Ananth International school 
 St Mary's English Higher primary school
 Aashirvad Public school
 Sri Basvarajendra High School
Sri Gouramma School
 Sri Vasavi School
 Sri Vidyashankara Public School
Anubhava Mantapa (S.T.J)
Rotary school
Basaveshwara higher primary school
Sri Vidya Shankara Public School
Podar International School

Colleges 
 JSKPU College
 Jnanashree expert pu college
 KPS pu college, arsikere
 Ananth PU College 
 Adhichunchanagiri Science PU college
 Siddeshwara pu college 
 Prathiba College
 Vivekananda College of Education
 Government Boys Junior College
 Hoysaleshwara pu college
 Ananthasadvidya College of Education
 Al Ameen College
 Hoysaleshwara degree College
 Vivekananda BEd College
 Govt first grade college Arasikere
 St. Mary's composite PU College for commerce
Royal institute Of Commerce(Royal Degree College)

Transportation
Arsikere serves as a common point for people travelling from Bengaluru and Mysuru towards north-western and central Karnataka region. Thus, public transport buses of all four branches of KSRTC can be found here. Tumakuru-Shivamogga four-lane expressway, comprising parts of NH-73 & NH-69 is under construction, as of Nov-2022.
 
Arsikere railway junction belongs to the Mysore division and is a major railway junction between Bengaluru – Hubli, Bengaluru – Shivamogga, Mysuru – Shivamogga and also connects Mangalore via hassan railway station. Trains typically stop here before heading to Hassan, Bangalore, Hubli, Mysuru and Mangalore.

Nearly 100 trains stop here and is around 166  km from state capital Bengaluru.  It has five trains starts from here to Bengaluru, Mysuru, Shivamogga and Hubballi. Around 30,000 people travel from Arsikere to other parts of Karnataka every day.

Nearest international airport is Kempegowda International Airport at 190 kms. Other nearby international airport is Mangalore International Airport at 220 kms. Domestic airport which is under construction near Shivamogga is around 110 kms.

Festivals
Various festivals are celebrated in Arasikere, including the following:

 Yadhapura "Sri Jenukallu Siddeshwara Swamy Jatramahotsava" is a big festival held every month during full moon day.
 Ganapathi Pendal (where a large Ganesha statue is displayed for about ninety days in Pendal), Ganapathi Chathurti, and Ganapathi Visarjana which has been celebrated from past 72(in 2017) years (where an idol of Ganesha is immersed into the lake near Arasikere). During these festivals, Sports, cultural, and spiritual activities are organized.
 Undiganalu "Sri Kariyamma Devi Jatramahotsava" is the biggest festival in Arasikere taluk which is held in the month of April. 
 Malekallu Thirupathi Fair takes place annually for the god Venkataramana and Govindaraja.

Places of interest
Notable places around Arsikere include the following:

Temples and architecture
 The Kalameshwara Temple (also Ishwara), also known as Kattameshvara and Chandramoulishvara by devotees, is a monument in the Hoysala style of architecture. It faces east and dates to 1220 A.D. 
 Sahasrakuta Jinalaya has a Hoysala building from 1220 A.D. and was constructed by Vasudhaika bandhava Recharasa, a minister of Veera Ballala II.
 Malekal Tirupathi Hill, also called (Chikka Tirupati) is three kilometers from Arsikere and has two temples: (Venkataramana and Govindaraja), which are frequently visited by pilgrims. Malekal Tirupathi Hill has 1,300 steps and a standing Venkateshwara idol. 
 Chikka Tirupati which is also called as Malekallu Tirupati or Amaragiri Malekallu Tirupati. It is located 3 km away from Arsikere, Hassan district. The main God worshipped here is Lord Balaji or Sri Venkataramana Swamy. There is a temple on the top of the hill which contains 1300 steps. There is a belief that sage Agasthya had offered prayers here to Lord Balaji and was blessed with lords Darshan here. It is also said that sage Vashista lived here and went to atonement by worshipping Lord Venkataramana Swamy, and on the day of Suddha Dwadashi Lord appeared and blessed him and hence this day every year a Maharathothsava will be held and is celebrated as one of the biggest fest. On this day we can find many people who climb the hill and offer prayers to Lord. And also there will be huge gathering for Rathothsava.  Even at the bottom of the hill there is a temple built and Vigraha installed here, too. This was done by a Palegar. The temple is built in Hoysala architecture. The temple is combination of Dravidian Architecture and Nagara style. There is a beautiful Kalyani near the temple.  Tourists come for the attractive local nature. And it is one of the must visit places in and around Arsikere.
 Jenukallu Siddeshwara swamy hill 
 Hirekallu Sri Siddeshwara Betta Near JC PURA Ramanahalli Forest well known pilgrim center and very beautiful place for one day trekking Power full God also .
 Sainatha and Ganapathi temples are of modern design and construction.
 Arasikere is home to naturally built elephant stone, situated at heart of the town in Shri Subrahmanya Ane Betta.
 Sri Siddarameshwara Temple in Sunkadahalli,
 Sri Siddarameshwara Gadduge is located 12 kilometers from Arsikere, near Banavara. 
 Sri Devamma Devi Devalaya T Kodihalli near Thalalur is located 10 kilometers from Arsikere town.
 Sri Veerabhadra Swami and Honaldajji Temple of Jajur is located 2 kilometers from Arsikere center.
 Shree shyla Mallikarjuna temple, Challapura is located 8 kilometers from trekking*

Others
The Nagapuri fortress, built on the Hirekal hill, is eleven kilometres north of Arasikere and is said to have been constructed by Hyder Ali.
A state branch of the Kastur Ba Gandhi National Memorial Trust is located at Kastur Ba Gram.
Garudanagiri hill, which is 25 kilometers from arsikere has a fort on the top of the hill. It is a good place for trekking.

Nearby towns and places of interest
 Undiganalu which is the village located in between Arasikere and Javagal there are historical temples called Kariyamma Devi Temple, Chamundeshwari Temple, Gavisiddeshwara temple (located in the hill top), Bhalu Basaveshwara Temple (located midway). There are many festivals in that the Kariyamma Devi Jathramahothsava is the one of the popular festivals in Arasikere Taluk. Unidiganalu is located 28 km from Arasikere and 11 km from Javagal.
 Javagal, the hobli, is about 33 km from Arasikere and about 35 km from Hassan. It has a temple dedicated to Lakshminarasimha, which is a good specimen of Hoysala architecture with an outer entrance. This temple is attributed to the middle of the 13th century A.D.
 Haranahally is a big village about eight kilometres south of Arasikere; there are remains of an old fort that is said to have been erected in 1070 A.D. by a chief named Someshvara Raya. There is a large Nagarti tank, which was named after his daughter.
 Bannavara is a nearby town where on can see an old forts and a temple.

Notable people
Notable people from Arsikere include:M L A K M Shivalinge Gowda
 Balakrishna, Kannada actor
 David Johnson, cricketer
 Javagal Srinath, Indian cricketer and pace bowler
 Ashok Haranahalli, Former Advocate General to Govt. of Karnataka 
 Haranahalli Ramaswamy, Former Irrigation Minister and founding member of the Malnad Education Trust
 Channa Keshava Sharma, Freedom fighter and Tamra Pathra Awardee
 Narayana Gowda, Chief of Karnataka Rakshana Vedike
 Chandrika, actress in Kannada Film Industry
 Aparna, actress, Kannada anchor
 Dr. H. R. Swamy, A rationalist, environmentalist, Theatre person, Thinker
 D. S. Ramaswamy, Poet
 Rajanand, Kannada actor
 D Shankar Singh, Kannada producer/director
 Dhananjay (actor), Kannada actor
 Doddanna, Kannada actor

Image gallery

See also
Arakere Village
Ajjanahalli, Arsikere
Banavara
Hoysala architecture
Kanakatte
Singarasa
 Channarayapatna
 Munjenahalli
 Gandasi Handpost

References

Cities and towns in Hassan district